Naveh is a religious moshav in south-central Israel. Located near the Egyptian border, it falls under the jurisdiction of Eshkol Regional Council.

History
The village was established in 2008 by former residents of Bnei Atzmon, an Israeli settlement in the Gaza Strip that was evacuated as part of the Israeli disengagement from Gaza. Many of the residents are followers of Rabbi Zvi Thau of Har Hamor yeshiva.

Notable residents
Rafi Peretz

References

Moshavim
Populated places established in 2008
2008 establishments in Israel
Populated places in Southern District (Israel)